Julliard may refer to:
 Alexandre Julliard, computer programmer who leads the Wine project
 Bruno Julliard, former chairman of the French student union Union Nationale des Étudiants de France
 Jean-François Julliard, Secretary General of Reporters Without Borders
 Éditions Julliard, French publishing house founded in 1942 by René Julliard
 The Jean Julliard Prize, a scientific prize awarded by the International Society of Blood Transfusion

See also
 Juilliard (disambiguation)